The Space Coast is a region in the U.S. state of Florida around the Kennedy Space Center (KSC) and Cape Canaveral Space Force Station. It is one of several "themed" coasts around Florida. All orbital launches from American soil carrying NASA astronauts (running from Project Mercury in 1961 to the end of the Space Shuttle program in 2011, and since 2020 using the SpaceX Dragon 2) have departed from either KSC or Cape Canaveral. The Space Force Station has also launched unmanned military and civilian rockets. Cities in the area include Port St. John, Titusville, Cocoa, Rockledge, Cape Canaveral, Merritt Island (unincorporated), Cocoa Beach, Melbourne, Satellite Beach, Indian Harbour Beach, Indialantic, Melbourne Beach,  Palm Bay, and Viera (unincorporated). Most of the area lies within Brevard County. It is bounded on the south by the Treasure Coast, on the west and north by Central Florida (and is economically tied to that region), and on the east by the Atlantic Ocean.

One reason rockets are launched from the Space Coast has to do with the Earth's rotation. The Earth rotates from west to east, most quickly at the equator, and to take advantage of this, adding the speed of rotation to the orbital velocity of the rocket, it is most beneficial to launch eastward from a location near the equator. Launching from an uninhabited location on an easterly coast at low latitude, minimizing the danger posed by debris from a failed launch, is ideal both for the safety of the people on the ground and for fuel efficiency of the rocket. Given the high population densities in coastal Texas, South Florida, and Puerto Rico, the Space Coast is often considered the best location when all factors are taken into account.

Space-named landmarks (outside KSC and Cape Canaveral Space Force Station) 
Many places near the Cape are named for subjects relating to the US space program including vehicles, astronauts, and the spaceport itself.

 Alan Shepard Park, Cocoa Beach
 Apollo Boulevard, Melbourne
 Apollo Elementary School, Titusville
 Armstrong Drive, Titusville
 Astronaut Boulevard, Cape Canaveral
 Astronaut High School, Titusville
 Atlantis Elementary School, Port St. John
 Bayside High School, Palm Bay 
 Challenger 7 Elementary School, Port St. John
 Challenger Memorial Parkway, (State Road 407), Titusville
 Chaffee Drive, Titusville
 Christa McAuliffe drawbridge, Merritt Island
 Christa McAuliffe Elementary School, Palm Bay
 Columbia Boulevard (State Road 405), Titusville
 Columbia Elementary School, Palm Bay
 Columbia Village, Melbourne (Florida Institute of Technology)
 Discovery Elementary School, Palm Bay
 Endeavour Elementary Magnet school, Cocoa
 Enterprise Elementary School, Cocoa
 Freedom 7 Elementary School, Cocoa Beach
 Gemini Elementary School, Melbourne Beach
 Grissom Parkway, Cocoa
 I Dream Of Jeannie Drive, Cocoa Beach
 John F. Kennedy Middle School, Rockledge
 Jupiter Boulevard, Palm Bay
 Kennedy Point Park, Titusville
 MILA Elementary School, Merritt Island (an abbreviation for "Merritt Island Launch Area")
 Minutemen Causeway, Cocoa Beach
 NASA Boulevard (State Road 508), Melbourne
 Ronald McNair Middle Magnet School, Rockledge
 Satellite Beach, Florida
 Satellite Boulevard, Cocoa
 Satellite High School, Satellite Beach
 Shepard Drive, Titusville
 Space Coast Jr./Sr. High School
 Space Coast Stadium, Viera, Florida
 Space Coast Surge, a member of the Florida Winter Baseball League played out of Cocoa in 2009
 Space View Park, Titusville
 White Drive, Titusville

Telephone area code 
When the region became too heavily populated to be served by only one area code, a local resident Robert Osband (aka Richard Cheshire) discovered that area code 321 was not assigned to any other territory (though it was being considered for the suburban Chicago area). If each number is pronounced individually—"3, 2, 1"—the pronunciation resembles the countdown before liftoff; thus, the resident petitioned for the code to be assigned to the Space Coast region. His efforts were popular among local residents and resulted in success; the new code officially became effective on November 1, 1999.

Tourism

Because it is home to Kennedy Space Center and Cape Canaveral Space Force Station the local area is popular with visitors to watch rocket launches in person. Over 100,000 people are believed to have been present in February 2018 for the Falcon Heavy test flight. It is home to Kennedy Space Center Visitor Complex, US Space Walk of Fame, and the  Air Force Space and Missile Museum. Nearly 1 million people were present to watch the last space shuttle launch in 2011. 150,000 people were present for the Crew Dragon Demo-2 launch. The area is also home to many space-themed businesses. 750,000 to 900,000 people gathered on the space coast to watch the Apollo 11 launch in 1969.

The area also sees Christmas tourism, as thousands of people attend the Surfing Santas festival in Cocoa Beach (by Cape Canaveral) over the holiday season.

Media 
Brevard Business News is a weekly newspaper in Melbourne, Florida, United States covering business news and trends for the Space Coast. Fred Krupski started Brevard Business News in 1981, and Adrienne B. Roth purchased it in 1986.

See also

First Coast
Gold Coast
Space Coast Office of Tourism
Treasure Coast

Notes

References

Geography of Brevard County, Florida
Regions of Florida
Central Florida
East Coast of the United States
Coasts of Florida